Baryphthengus is a genus of birds in the family Momotidae. They are found in forests of South and Central America. Both species have a long tail, a black mask, and a plumage that is mainly green and rufous.

Species

References
Museum Heineanum, p. 114

 
Bird genera